David Edgar Alderson Horne (14 July 1898 in Balcombe, Sussex – 15 March 1970 in Marylebone, London) was an English film and stage actor.

Biography
British actor and playwright David Horne began his film career in the 1930s, after a distinguished early career in the theatre. He was generally seen portraying pompous, self-satisfied characters. He never managed to rise to the "star" level in his silver screen acting career, but he was an indispensable character actor, and played many utility parts such as desk clerks, newspaper editors, police officials, lawyers and doctors. He continued his theatre work until his death in 1970.

In 1924 he married the former actress Renée Mayer. The marriage was later dissolved.

Filmography

 Lord of the Manor (1933) as General Sir George Fleeter (film debut)
 General John Regan (1933) as Maj. Kent
 Badger's Green (1934) as Major Forrester
 The Case for the Crown (1934) as James Rainsford
 That's My Uncle (1935) as Col. Marlowe
 The Village Squire (1935) as Squire Hollis
 Late Extra (1935) - Williams as Newspaper Editor
 Hyde Park Corner (1935)
 Gentlemen's Agreement (1935) as Sir Charles Lysle
 Under Proof (1936) as Dr. Walton
 The Cardinal (1936) as English Abbot
 Debt of Honour (1936) as Colonel Mayhew
 It's Love Again (1936) as Durland
 The Interrupted Honeymoon (1936) as Colonel Craddock
 Seven Sinners (1936) as Hotel Manager
 The House of the Spaniard (1936) as 2nd Captain
 Conquest of the Air (1936) as Nero (uncredited)
 The Mill on the Floss (1936) as Mr. Deane (uncredited)
 Farewell Again (1937) as John Carlisle
 The Green Cockatoo (1937) (uncredited)
 Blind Folly (1940) as Mr. Steel
 21 Days (1940) as Beavis
 The Stars Look Down (1940) as Mr. Wilkins
 Crimes at the Dark House (1940) as Frederick Fairlie
 Return to Yesterday (1940) as Morrison
 Night Train to Munich (1940) as Official at Prague Steel Works (uncredited)
 The Door with Seven Locks (1940) as Edward Havelock
 Inspector Hornleigh Goes to It (1941) as Commissioner
 Breach of Promise (1942) as Sir Hamar
 The Day Will Dawn (1942) as Evans, Foreign Editor
 They Flew Alone (1942) as Solicitor
 The First of the Few (1942) as Mr. Higgins
 The Young Mr. Pitt (1942) as Mayor (uncredited)
 Yellow Canary (1943) as Admiral (uncredited)
 San Demetrio London (1943)  
 The Hundred Pound Window (1944) as Baldwin
 Don't Take It to Heart (1944) as Sir Henry Wade, Prosecuting Counsel
 The Man from Morocco (1945) as Dr. Duboste
 I Live in Grosvenor Square (1945) as War Office Major
 They Were Sisters (1945) as Mr. Field
 The Seventh Veil (1945) as Dr. Kendall
 The Wicked Lady (1945) as Martin Worth
 The Rake's Progress (1945) as Sir John Brockley
 Gaiety George (1946) as Lord Mountsbury
 Caravan (1946) as Charles Camperdene
 The Magic Bow (1946) as Rizzi
 Men of Two Worlds (1946) as Concert Agent
 Spring Song (1946) as Sir Anthony
 The Man Within (1947) as Dr. Stanton
 Easy Money (1948) as Mr. Hessian (voice, uncredited)
 Saraband for Dead Lovers (1948) as Duke George William
 It's Hard to Be Good (1948) as Edward Beckett
 Once Upon a Dream (1949) as Registrar
 The History of Mr. Polly (1949) as Mr. Garvace
 Madeleine (1950) as Lord Justice-Clerk
 Appointment with Venus (1951) as Magistrate
 Street Corner (1953) as Judge (uncredited)
 Martin Luther (1953) as Duke Frederick
 Spaceways (1953) as Minister
 The Intruder (1953) as General
 Beau Brummell (1954) as Thurlow
 Three Cases of Murder (1955) as Sir James (segment "Lord Mountdrago")
 The Last Man to Hang? (1956) as Antony Harcombe, Q.C.
 Lust for Life (1956) as Rev. Peeters
 The Prince and the Showgirl (1957) as The Foreign Office
 The Safecracker (1958) as Herbert Fenwright
 The Sheriff of Fractured Jaw (1958) as James, His Butler
 The Devil's Disciple (1959) as Uncle William
 The Clue of the New Pin (1961) as John Tredmere
 Goodbye Again (1961) as Queen's Counsel
 Dentist on the Job (1961) as Admiral Southbound
 Nurse on Wheels (1963) as Dr. Golfrey Senior
 The Big Job (1965) as Judge
 A Flea in Her Ear (1968) as The Prosecutor
 Diamonds for Breakfast (1968) as Duke of Windemere (final film)

Stage

Witness for the Prosecution (1953) as Sir Wilfrid Robarts QC

References

External links

1898 births
1970 deaths
English male film actors
English male stage actors
Male actors from Sussex
20th-century English male actors
People from Balcombe, West Sussex